The Lost River is a  stream in the White Mountains of New Hampshire in the United States. It is a tributary of Moosilauke Brook, part of the Pemigewasset River watershed leading to the Merrimack River.

The Lost River begins on the eastern slopes of Mount Moosilauke below the peak of Mount Jim and above Kinsman Notch, one of the major passes through the White Mountains. As it flows through the notch, it passes through Lost River Gorge, an area where enormous boulders falling off the flanking walls of the notch at the close of the last Ice Age have covered the river, creating a network of boulder caves. The gorge is owned by the Society for the Protection of New Hampshire Forests and is operated as a tourist attraction, with trails and ladders accessing many of the caves.

The river flows southeast from Kinsman Notch to Jackman Brook, where the two streams form Moosilauke Brook, which continues northeast through the granite gorge of Agassiz Basin and joins the Pemigewasset River in the village of North Woodstock.

New Hampshire Route 112 follows the Lost River from Kinsman Notch to Moosilauke Brook.

See also

List of rivers of New Hampshire

References

External links
Lost River Gorge & Boulder Caves website

Tributaries of the Merrimack River
Rivers of New Hampshire
Rivers of Grafton County, New Hampshire